Stephen de Vries is a Dutch paralympic cyclist. He participated at the 2016 Summer Paralympics in the cycling competition, being awarded the bronze medal in the men's individual pursuit B event. Patrick Bos was his pilot.

References

External links 
Paralympic Games profile

Living people
Place of birth missing (living people)
Year of birth missing (living people)
Dutch male cyclists
Cyclists at the 2016 Summer Paralympics
Medalists at the 2016 Summer Paralympics
Paralympic medalists in paratriathlon
Paralympic cyclists of the Netherlands
Paralympic bronze medalists for the Netherlands
21st-century Dutch people